Orthotylus moncreaffi is a species of bug in the Miridae family that is can be found in Belgium, Denmark, France, Germany, Greece, Great Britain, Italy, Moldova, Portugal, Romania, Spain, the Netherlands, and European part of Turkey.

References

Insects described in 1874
Hemiptera of Europe
moncreaffi